This is a list of electoral results for the electoral district of Whittlesea in Victorian state elections.

Members for Whittlesea

Election results

Elections in the 1980s

References

Victoria (Australia) state electoral results by district